Mary Elizabeth Frances Henry (born 11 May 1940 in Blackrock, Cork) is a former Irish politician and medical doctor. She was an independent member of Seanad Éireann. She was elected Pro-Chancellor of the University of Dublin in 2012.   By profession she is a University Professor and medical practitioner. In 1966 she married John McEntagart of Dublin, Merchant and they have three children. She is a member of the Church of Ireland.

She is a graduate of the Trinity College Dublin (B.A. in English and History of Medicine 1963, M.B. (Honours) (1965), M.A. (1966) M.D. (1968)). As an undergraduate, among many other distinctions she won the Sir James Craig Memorial Prize in Medicine.

She represented the Dublin University constituency in the Seanad from 1993 until 2007.

From 1997 she served a two-year term as president of The Irish Association for Cultural, Economic and Social Relations.

She did not stand in the 2007 Seanad election, and Ivana Bacik was elected to succeed her.

References

External links
Comments on Ferns Report 2005

1940 births
Living people
Irish Anglicans
Alumni of Trinity College Dublin
Members of Seanad Éireann for Dublin University
Independent members of Seanad Éireann
Politicians from County Cork
Members of the 20th Seanad
Members of the 21st Seanad
Members of the 22nd Seanad
20th-century women members of Seanad Éireann
21st-century women members of Seanad Éireann